Reagantown is an unincorporated community in Sevier County, Tennessee, United States.

Notes

Unincorporated communities in Sevier County, Tennessee
Unincorporated communities in Tennessee